The Minister of the Interior (Italian: Ministro dell'Interno) in Italy is one of the most important positions in the Italian Council of Ministers and leads the Ministry of the Interior. The current Minister is prefect Matteo Piantedosi,  appointed on 22 October 22 in the Meloni Cabinet. 

The Minister of the Interior is responsible for internal security and the protection of the constitutional order, for civil protection against disasters and terrorism, for displaced persons and administrative questions. It is host to the Standing Committee of Interior Ministers and also drafts all passport, identity card, firearms, and explosives legislation.

The Interior Minister is political head for the administration of internal affairs. They control the State police, the Vigili del Fuoco, and the prefects. The minister therefore sits on the High Council of Defence.

List of Italian Ministers of Interior

Kingdom of Italy
Parties

Coalitions

Italian Republic
 Parties

Coalitions

Timeline

Kingdom of Italy

Republic of Italy

References

Lists of government ministers of Italy

1861 establishments in Italy